The 2010 FEI World Equestrian Games (officially the 2010 Alltech FEI World Equestrian Games) were held at the Kentucky Horse Park in Lexington, Kentucky, U.S. from September 25 to October 10, 2010. This was the sixth edition of the games, which are held every four years and run by the International Federation for Equestrian Sports (FEI). For the first time, Para-equestrian events were added in the program. This was also the first time the games were hosted by a city outside of Europe, and also the first time that all events at the games were held at a single site. (Although the 100-mile/161-km endurance course, by necessity, was mostly contained outside the park, the main veterinary gate was located within the park.)

Alltech, an animal health and nutrition company located in Nicholasville, Kentucky (about 15 minutes from downtown Lexington and 30 minutes from the Horse Park), was the title sponsor of the 2010 Games. The sponsorship was valued at $10 million. However, Alltech's total support went far beyond the name sponsorship package. The company had nearly 60 employees involved with the promotion of the Games—more than the size of the official FEI World Games staff. When the organizing committee for the Games announced a budget cutback due to lower-than-expected ticket sales, Alltech stepped up its financial support. Company founder and president Pearse Lyons also brought in University of Kentucky basketball head coach John Calipari to promote a special luxury ticket package. At the time of the Games, the company's support was estimated to have been $32 million, and the company was expected to (and ultimately did) sponsor the next edition of the Games held in the French region of Normandy in 2014.

Schedule
All times are US EDT (UTC-4)

18 events were contested over 8 disciplines. Para Dressage was included for the first time.

Dressage

Combined driving

Endurance

Eventing

Jumping

Para Dressage

Reining

Vaulting

Officials
Appointment of (Olympic disciplines) officials was as follows:

Dressage
  Linda Zang (Ground Jury President)
  Evi Eisenhardt (Ground Jury Member)
  Ghislain Fouarge (Ground Jury Member)
  Stephen Clarke (Ground Jury Member)
  Maribel Alonso de Quinzanos (Ground Jury Member)
  Cara Whitham (Ground Jury Member)
  Mary Seefried (Ground Jury Member)
  Wojtech Markowski (Technical Delegate)

Jumping
  Jon Doney (Ground Jury President)
  Michael Detemple (Ground Jury Member)
  Kim Morrison (Ground Jury Member)
  Linda Allen (Ground Jury Member)
  Frank Rothenberger (Technical Delegate)

Eventing
  Marylin Payne (Ground Jury President)
  David Lee (Ground Jury Member)
  Anne-Mette Binder (Ground Jury Member)
  Linda Allen (Jumping judge)
  Tom Ryckewaert (Technical Delegate)

Para-Dressage
  Hanneke Gerritsen (Ground Jury President)
  Liliana Marcelina Iannone (Ground Jury Member)
  Gudrun Hofinga (Ground Jury Member)
  Anne Prain (Ground Jury Member)
  Jan Geary (Ground Jury Member)
  Sarah Rodger (Ground Jury Member)
  Carlos Lopes (Ground Jury Member)
  Kjell Myhre (Ground Jury Member)
  Jane Goldsmith (Technical Delegate)

Participating nations
58 countries were represented at the games.

  Argentina
  Australia
  Austria
  Azerbaijan
  Bahrain
  Belgium
  Bermuda
  Brazil
  Canada
  Chile
  China PR
  Chinese Taipei
  Colombia
  Costa Rica
  Czech Republic
  Denmark
  Dominican Republic
  Ecuador
  Egypt
  El Salvador
  Finland
  France
  Germany
  Great Britain
  Guatemala
  Hungary
  Ireland
  India
  Israel
  Italy
  Japan
  Jordan
  Lithuania
  Luxembourg
  Mexico
  Namibia
  Netherlands
  Netherlands Antilles
  New Zealand
  Norway
  Poland
  Portugal
  Qatar
  Russia
  Saudi Arabia
  Singapore
  Slovakia
  South Africa
  Spain
  Sweden
  Switzerland
  Syria
  Turkey
  Ukraine
  United Arab Emirates
  Uruguay
  USA
  Venezuela
  Zambia

Medalists and special awards

Medals table

References

External links
Official website
A Horse Marathon Takes On the Pace of NASCAR - slideshow by The New York Times

E
Equestrian sports competitions in the United States
FEI World Equestrian Games
International sports competitions hosted by the United States
Sports competitions in Lexington, Kentucky
FEI World Equestrian Games
FEI World Equestrian
FEI World Equestrian Games
FEI World Equestrian Games
Horse driving competition
Para Dressage